North Common may refer to several places in England:

 North Common, East Sussex
 North Common, Gloucestershire
 North Common, Suffolk, a United Kingdom location

See also